Coronaster is a genus of the Asteriidae family of starfish.

Species
The World Register of Marine Species lists the following species:

 Coronaster briareus (Verrill, 1882)
 Coronaster eclipes Fisher, 1925
 Coronaster halicepus Fisher, 1917
 Coronaster marchenus Ziesenhenne, 1942
 Coronaster pauciporis Jangoux, 1984
 Coronaster reticulatus (H.L. Clark, 1916)
 Coronaster sakuranus (Döderlein, 1902)
 Coronaster volsellatus (Sladen, 1889)

References

Asteriidae
Taxa named by Edmond Perrier